This is a list of recordings of La Grande-Duchesse de Gérolstein, an opéra bouffe (a form of operetta), in three acts and four tableaux by Jacques Offenbach to an original French libretto by Henri Meilhac and Ludovic Halévy. The work was first performed in Paris on 12 April 1867.

The following recordings are in French unless otherwise indicated.

Recordings

References
Notes

Cited sources
Recordings of La Grande-Duchesse de Gérolstein on operadis-opera-discography.org.uk, accessed 20 June 2011

Opera discographies
Operas by Jacques Offenbach